Andrew K. Trull (1956–2004) was a noted chemist who put forward many important studies into immunology and other matters. He worked mainly at Papworth Hospital but also presented his work all over the world.

Publications 
Biomarkers of Disease: An Evidence-Based Approach  (as editor)

1956 births
2004 deaths
British chemists